Graduation is the awarding of a diploma to a student by an educational institution. It may also refer to the ceremony that is associated with it. The date of the graduation ceremony is often called graduation day. The graduation ceremony is also sometimes called: commencement, congregation, convocation or invocation.

History
Ceremonies for graduating students date from the first universities in Europe in the twelfth century. At that time Latin was the language of scholars. A universitas was a guild of masters (such as MAs) with licence to teach. "Degree" and "graduate" come from gradus, meaning "step". The first step was admission to a bachelor's degree. The second step was the masters step, giving the graduate admission to the universitas and license to teach. Typical dress for graduation is gown and hood, or hats adapted from the daily dress of university staff in the Middle Ages, which was in turn based on the attire worn by medieval clergy.

The tradition of wearing graduation hats in Sweden has been in place since the mid-eighteenth century. The cap is typically a white sailor hat with a black or dark blue band around it, a crown motif, and a black peak at the front. The graduation hat tradition was initially adopted by students at Uppsala University. The headgear then became popular across several other European nations as well.

Ceremony
Usually the ceremony and name apply to university degrees (Associate's, Bachelor's, Master's, and Doctoral degrees).

In a graduation ceremony at the college and university level, the presiding officer or another authorized person formally confers degrees upon candidates, either individually or en masse, even though graduates may physically receive their diploma later at a smaller college or departmental ceremony, or simply receive their diploma through the mail.

Ceremonies often include a procession of some of the academic staff and candidates and a valediction. The academic staff will usually wear an academic dress at the ceremony, as will the trustees (if applicable) and the degree candidates. Graduates can be referred to by their year of graduation.

Graduation in absentia
When a student graduates without attending the graduation ceremony, then it is called graduation in absentia.

United States (non-tertiary graduations)
In the United States, the completion of mandatory schooling is also referred to as graduating, even though it is substantially below degree level.

Graduations for high school, middle school and kindergarten. Also, even for passing from one school year to the next, have been a development of recent years. This has received criticism, being described as "just a way of celebrating mediocrity".

In some places, graduation parties celebrating graduation from school, college or university are popular. In a recent 2014 nationwide survey in the United States, $985 was the average amount spent on graduation parties.

By country

The procedures and traditions surrounding academic graduation ceremonies differ around the world. Whereas in the United Kingdom a graduation usually only occurs at university level, in the United States and many other countries graduations also occur at high schools where no higher education qualifications are conferred upon the graduates. In a graduation ceremony the students wear formal academic dress, such as square academic caps and gowns that are used for such occasions.

Graduation traditions vary across universities observing different cultures.

For example, most universities in Sweden are research-oriented and may present their students with bachelor's, master's, and doctor's degrees covering all academic streams. Universities across the country are based through the Higher Education Ordinance. Most of the national programs provide Swedish, English, math and science among degree courses.

In Zimbabwe, graduation ceremonies are often associated with the guest of honor who most often is the ceremonial head of the institution. At state universities the president of the country officiates as chancellor and guest of honor. Every graduate of a state university in Zimbabwe can claim to have shaken the President's hand. The person most associated with graduation at those institutions is Zimbabwe's late ex-president Robert Mugabe. At other state institutions of higher learning, the vice presidents or other senior government officials may preside.

Otherwise, in countries like Argentina and Uruguay, enthusiasm prevails over moderation, as well as taking part in an authentic carnival as part of the celebration that is mostly spontaneous, anarchic, and barely planned in the middle of the streets: hundreds of graduates, familiars and friends gather in an open place, carrying alcoholic drinks, eggs, flour and other messy food; pelting it all over the graduates; whereas the party is public and open to excesses that carry the complaints of all sorts of commerce, neighbours and authorities in the zone due to the concentration of public disorder and filth that lasts until the aftermath and overwhelms the municipal services.

See also
 Academic dress
 Commencement speech
 Encaenia
 Exit examination
 Matriculation

Notes and references

External links
 The Stories Behind Graduation Traditions by Ethan Trex, Mental Floss

 
Educational stages
School terminology
Ceremonies